In the first edition of the tournament, Karel Nováček won the title by defeating Fabrice Santoro 6–4, 7–5 in the final.

Seeds

Draw

Finals

Top half

Bottom half

References

External links
 Official results archive (ATP)
 Official results archive (ITF)

1993 ATP Tour
1993 Dubai Tennis Championships